Orszewice  is a village in the administrative district of Gmina Góra Świętej Małgorzaty, within Łęczyca County, Łódź Voivodeship, in central Poland.

The village has an approximate population of 240.

References

Orszewice